Kunnumma is a village in Alappuzha district in the Indian state of Kerala.

Demographics
 India census, Kunnumma had a population of 14918 with 7349 males and 7569 females.

References

Villages in Alappuzha district